The Aragon House, at 2nd and Oak Sts. in Magdalena, New Mexico, was built around 1915.  It was listed on the National Register of Historic Places in 1982.

It is a one-and-a-half-story stuccoed adobe house built upon a stone foundation.

It was deemed significant "as a good example of finer houses built during Magdalena's wealthiest years. The house has broad proportions and fine details which include the front veranda, stained glass, and bell-cast roof."  It was listed as part of a multiple resource study of historic properties in Magdalena.

References

External links

		
National Register of Historic Places in Socorro County, New Mexico
Houses completed in 1915